"Love Your Way" is a song from Powderfinger's fifth studio album Vulture Street. It was the second single released from Vulture Street in September 2003 and reached No. 37 on the Australian music chart.

The single's artwork is a high contrast colour painting of the Australian Outback with a photograph of a girl in a bikini walking a dog pasted onto it. The girl is desaturated and the ground is colourised to bright fuchsia.

Audio sample
This audio sample indicates the chorus and part of a verse of the song.

Music video
The music video for "Love Your Way" was directed by Scott Walton of Fifty Fifty Films, and features Bernard Fanning and Darren Middleton in a fencing match. At the end of the second chorus, the other band members appear in fencing uniforms and are defeated by Fanning. At the end of the song, Fanning throws his fencing mask down at Middleton, concluding the match.

Track listing

Australian Version
 "Love Your Way" – 4:22
 "Rocket Reducer No. 62 (Rama Lama Fa Fa Fa)" – 4:25
 "Hard Luck Dave" – 3:17
 "City Hum" ("Love Your Way" Demo) – 4:19

UK Version
Enhanced content CD
 "Love Your Way"
 "Morning Sun"
 "Number of the Beast"
 Enhanced content:
 "Love Your Way" (video)
 Photo gallery

Charts

References

Powderfinger songs
2003 singles
2003 songs
Universal Records singles
Songs written by Jon Coghill
Songs written by John Collins (Australian musician)
Songs written by Bernard Fanning
Songs written by Ian Haug
Songs written by Darren Middleton